And Here's What's Happening to Me is a 2012 Russian comedy-drama film directed by Viktor Shamirov.

Plot 
The film takes place on December 31. A fifteen-year-old girl's father dies, and she does not know who she wants to become, an oncologist or a food designer. This film is about what was and what has become.

Cast 
 Gosha Kutsenko as Artyom
 Viktor Shamirov as Valentin
 Aleksandra Petrova as Alyona
 Olesya Zheleznyak as Nastya
 Nikolai Chindyajkin as Famous Surgeon
 Margarita Shubina as Olga
 Aleksandr Robak as Alyona's father
 Aleksandr Grishaev as Aleksandr 
 Pavel Sborshchikov as Pavel
 Aleksey Trotsyuk as Igor

References

External links 
 

2012 films
2010s Russian-language films
Russian comedy-drama films
2012 comedy-drama films
Films set around New Year